Jackson's Wharf (1999–2000) was a New Zealand television series created by Gavin Strawhan and Rachel Lang. Set in a fictional coastal town, the series told the story of a sibling rivalry between brothers Frank, the town policeman the younger brother, and Ben Jackson, a big-town lawyer. After inheriting the local pub from his recently deceased father, Ben returns to the small town with his family, with his arrival bringing its fair share of drama and conflict to the small township. Ben is married to Mahina who is part of a Māori family 'who go back on the peninsula long before any Jacksons arrived'.

Jackson's Wharf was produced by Tony Holden, Laurence Wilson and Sandra Clark with directors Murray Keane, John Callen, John Laing, Geoffrey Cawthorn and Niki Caro. The writing team included Rachel Lang, Gavin Strawhan, James Griffin, Niki Caro, David Geary, Steven Zanoski, Deborah Wilton, Nick Malmholt, Kate McDermott, Peter Allison, MIranda Wilson, Liddy Holloway, Maxine Fleming, Roy Ward, Paul Sonne, Jan Prettejohns and Ellen Driver. There were two seasons.

Cast member Nicola Kawana who played Mahina was described as a 'stand-out talent' in the show.

Awards 
1999 New Zealand Television Award: Best Drama Script

External links

South Pacific Pictures

References 

1999 New Zealand television series debuts
2001 New Zealand television series endings
1990s New Zealand television series
2000s New Zealand television series
Television shows funded by NZ on Air
Television series by South Pacific Pictures
Television series by All3Media